Nules is a town in eastern Spain, in the province of Castellón (Valencian Community). Located 18 km to the south of the province's capital, at 13 m over sea level, it has 13,750 inhabitants (2010 data), living in Nules Town, Nules Beach and Mascarell.

Nules gives its name to the Nules variety of Clementine, which was first bred here in 1953. It is the most popular variety of Clementine grown in Spain.

The municipality includes Mascarell, a historical village.

Notable people
 Sergi Canós, footballer
 Rosita Amores
 Asensio Nebot, guerilla leader

References 

Municipalities in the Province of Castellón